McDull: The Pork of Music is a 2012 Hong Kong animated comedy film written and directed by Brian Tse. It was officially released in cinemas on 10 July 2012, in China.

Cast 

 Liu Hau Yeut
 Chan Yik Yi
 Man To Pok
 Wong Ka Wai
 Sin Lok Yi
 Lily Zhang

Reception
The film earned ¥49.2 million at the Chinese box office.

See also
McDull
Hong Kong films of 2012

References

External links

Official website

Hong Kong animated films
2012 animated films
2012 films
McDull
Animated comedy films
Hong Kong comedy films
2012 comedy films
2010s Hong Kong films